Baylus Benjamin McKinney or B. B. McKinney (July 22, 1886 – September 7, 1952), was an American singer, song writer, teacher, and music editor.

Biography
McKinney was a native of rural Heflin in south Webster Parish in northwestern Louisiana. He was an alumnus of Louisiana College in Pineville, Southwestern Baptist Theological Seminary in Fort Worth, Texas, and the Siegel-Myers School of Music and the Bush Conservatory of Music, both in Chicago, Illinois.

McKinney wrote the words and music to 149 hymns and gospel songs. His most famous are "The Nail Scarred Hand" (1924), "Let Others See Jesus in You" (1924), "Satisfied with Jesus" (1926), "Speak to My Heart" (1927), "'Neath the Old Olive Trees" (1934), "Breathe on Me" (1937), and "Wherever He Leads I'll Go" (1937). He was also the editor of the widely-used Broadman Hymnal (1940, Nashville).

B.B. McKinney Chapel (which was demolished in 2003-2004 for the construction of the new R.A. Young Tabernacle) was on the grounds of  Falls Creek Baptist Encampment in Davis, Oklahoma, it was named in his honor. He was posthumously inducted into the Gospel Music Hall of Fame in 1982.

References

1886 births
1952 deaths
American Christian hymnwriters
American gospel singers
People from Heflin, Louisiana
Louisiana Christian University alumni
Southwestern Baptist Theological Seminary alumni
Hymnal editors